Staffelkapitän is a position (not a rank) in flying units (Staffel) of the German Luftwaffe that is the equivalent of RAF/USAF Squadron Commander. Usually today a Staffelkapitän is of Oberstleutnant or Major rank.

In the Luftwaffe of the Wehrmacht the Staffelkapitän usually held the rank of an Oberleutnant or Hauptmann. For the first weeks of his assignment he was known as a Staffelführer (Squadron Leader), until he was confirmed in this position. If a Non-commissioned officer was tasked with this role, he was also referred to as a Staffelführer. This title is not to be confused with Staffelführer, a rank in the SS.

See also
Organization of the Luftwaffe (1933–1945)

References
Citations

Bibliography
 

Luftwaffe
Military ranks of Germany
Air force appointments